Sir James Nasmyth, 2nd Baronet ( – 4 February 1779), also known as Naesmyth, of Dawyck and Posso, Peebleshire, was a Scottish  botanist and politician who sat in the House of Commons between 1732 and 1741.

Early life
Nasmyth was the eldest son of Sir James Nasmyth, 1st Baronet, lawyer  of Dawyck and Posso and his wife Barbara Pringle, daughter of Andrew Pringle of Clifton, Roxburgh.
He succeeded to the baronetcy when his father died in 1720. He married Jean Keith, daughter of Thomas Keith.

Career
At the 1727 general election, Nasmyth contested Peeblesshire, a seat with about 20 voters which was controlled by the Earls of March.
 He lodged a petition after he was defeated by the sitting Member of Parliament (MP) John Douglas, claiming that the Sheriff of Peebles had been biased. The petition was rejected.

When Douglas died in 1731, Nasmyth contested the seat again at the resulting by-election on 28 April 1732, against the former MP Sir Alexander Murray, Bt. By this time the 2nd Earl of March had died, and the 3rd Earl was only 6 years old. Nasmyth won the seat with the support of the Deputy Sheriff, and Murray's petition was rejected.
 
Two separate election meetings were held at the 1734 general election, so the deputy sheriff made a double return of both Nasmyth and Murray. Murray withdrew his petition,
and on 7 February 1735 Nasmyth was declared to have been elected. He voted consistently with the government, and retired from the  House of Commons at the 1741 general election.

Later life and legacy
For his botanical work, Nasmyth was made a Fellow of the Royal Society in 1767.

Nasmyth died on 4 February 1779 leaving two sons. He was succeeded in the baronetcy by his son James.

References 
 

|-

1704 births
Year of birth uncertain
1779 deaths
Scottish botanists
Fellows of the Royal Society
Baronets in the Baronetage of Nova Scotia
Members of the Parliament of Great Britain for Scottish constituencies
British MPs 1727–1734
British MPs 1734–1741